Lionel Shave (1888-1954) was an Australian dramatist born in Victoria and died in Sydney. He married Doris Minnie Long (1891-1968), and was the father of the businessman and patron of the arts Kenneth Shave. His plays were produced by the Australian Broadcasting Commission.

Works
 1942 Twelve Moons Cold   
 1948 The Resignation of Mr. Bagsworth 
 1948 Red and Gold 
 1944 That's Murder: a mystery comedy in one act 
 1938 A Sirius Cove,  radio play 
 1935 The White Bud 
 1920 Pattern for a Fresco : a comedy in two acts 
 1919 The Lost Magic (poetry)
 1919 The Poet, the Muse and the Missus 
 1916 "One for Sorrer" (short story humour)
 1948 Wheatlands (as song lyricist with music by Iris Mason)

References

1888 births
1954 deaths
19th-century Australian novelists
20th-century Australian novelists
Australian male novelists
Writers from Adelaide
19th-century male writers
Australian male dramatists and playwrights
20th-century Australian male writers
19th-century Australian dramatists and playwrights
20th-century Australian dramatists and playwrights